"Count Me In" is a song written by Glen Hardin and performed by Gary Lewis & the Playboys. The song was produced by Snuff Garrett and arranged by Leon Russell, and reached No. 2 on the Billboard Hot 100, behind "Mrs. Brown, You've Got a Lovely Daughter" by Herman's Hermits. Outside the US, "Count Me In" went to No. 6 in Canada, and No. 49 in Australia in 1965. It was featured on their 1965 album, A Session with Gary Lewis and the Playboys.

Other versions
On the 2009 album, Dancing the Whole Way Home by Miss Li, "Bourgeois Shangri-la", uses piano sampling from the Gary Lewis & the Playboys version.
The melody of the song was used by the Playboys in an advertisement for Coca-Cola.

References

1965 songs
1965 singles
Gary Lewis & the Playboys songs
Song recordings produced by Snuff Garrett
Songs written by Glen Hardin
Liberty Records singles